Perfect Combination, or Perfect Combination: Seven Key Ingredients to Happily Living & Loving Together, is a self-help book by authors Jamillah and David Lamb focused on romantic relationships. In the book, the authors' personal relationship is recounted in both narrative and diary form.

Perfect Combination has been featured in media outlets including The Huffington Post, Amersterdam News, Harlem World Magazine, NBC's The Grio, and The New York Times.
The book explores such themes as love, ethnic identity, musical culture, and self-improvement.

Background
Jamillah and David Lamb are married and live in Brooklyn, New York. As business partners they founded Between The Lines Productions, Inc., and are producers of the Off-Broadway play Platanos Y Collard Greens.

Bibliography

References

External links
Perfect Combination Official site
Perfect Combination YouTube Channel

2012 non-fiction books
Self-help books